Daftmill distillery is a single malt Scotch whisky distillery, located in a converted barn at Daftmill Farm in the Howe of Fife.

The distillery was granted a licence by HMRC in 2005 to produce whisky and the first was produced on 16 December 2005.

Built in a converted meal mill and using un-peated malt, Daftmill has a maximum production capacity of only 20,000 litres of alcohol per year, making it a very low-volume distillery. Its first release was introduced as Daftmill 2005 12–Year Inaugural Release. All the grain used in distillation is produced on the farm.

See also
 Scotch whisky
 Lowland single malts

References

External links
 Daftmill Distillery
 Fife Place-name Data: Daftmill

Distilleries in Scotland
2005 establishments in Scotland